The 2006 Austrian Open was men's tennis tournament played on outdoor clay courts. It was the 36th edition of the Austrian Open, and was part of the International Series Gold of the 2006 ATP Tour. It took place at the Kitzbühel Sportpark Tennis Stadium in Kitzbühel, Austria, from 24 July through 30 July 2006. Ninth-seeded Agustín Calleri won the singles title.

Finals

Singles

 Agustín Calleri defeated  Juan Ignacio Chela 7–6(11–9), 6–2, 6–3
 It was Calleri's 1st singles title of the year and the 2nd of his career.

Doubles

 Stefan Koubek /  Philipp Kohlschreiber defeated  Oliver Marach /  Cyril Suk 6–2, 6–3
 It was Koubek's 1st title of the year and the 1st of his career. It was Kohlschreiber's 1st title of the year and the 2nd of his career.

References

External links
 Official website 
 ATP tournament profile
 ITF tournament edition details

Austrian Open (tennis)
Austrian Open Kitzbühel
2006 in Austrian tennis